Call of Duty 3 is a 2006 first-person shooter video game developed by Treyarch and published by Activision. It is the third major installment in the Call of Duty series. It was released for PlayStation 3, Wii, Xbox 360, PlayStation 2 and Xbox. It was a launch title for the PlayStation 3 and Wii in North America, Europe and Australia. It is also the only major installment to not release on the PC.

Gameplay
Call of Duty 3 is a historical first-person shooter game that has a single-player campaign mode and multiplayer mode. It is open-ended, giving the player multiple paths to complete objectives, but plays similarly to the series' previous installment. Players fight alongside AI-controlled teammates against enemies who use various attack patterns, hide behind cover, and regroup to improved defensive positions.

A character can be positioned in one of three stances: standing, crouching, or prone, each affecting the player's rate of movement and accuracy. Two firearms can be carried, and both fragmentation and smoke grenades can also be equipped; unlike previous installments in the series, players have the ability to toss live grenades back at the enemy. Weapons and ammo from fallen foes or friendlies can be picked up to replace weapons in a player's inventory. A player may fire from the hip or aim down the gun's iron sights for increased accuracy. The compass on the heads-up display (HUD) helps the player navigate to the location of each objective.

Using cover helps the player avoid enemy fire or recover health after taking significant damage. Similar to Call of Duty 2, the edges of the screen turn red and the character's heartbeat will increase in volume, indicating that the player's health is low; it can be replenished through an automatic recovery system when the character is not taking fire.

Campaign
The player takes the perspective of either an American, British, Canadian, or Polish soldier during the single-player campaign, for a total of 14 missions. Set in the Western Front of World War II, Call of Duty 3 takes place in the year 1944 and contains missions specific to four major Allied campaigns in the Battle of Normandy. The player takes part in a series of objectives marked by their HUD; these include having the character arrive at a checkpoint, eliminate enemies in a specified location, manning a tank, and marking targets for air strikes. Call of Duty 3 introduces to the series scripted close-combat sequences and multiple actions to arming explosives, both of which require the player to press buttons in sequences to progress.

Multiplayer
In addition to the single-player campaign, Call of Duty 3 features a wide range of multiplayer modes for players to participate in – each team allowing up to 24 on the PlayStation 3 and the Xbox 360, and 16 for the PlayStation 2 and Xbox in a single match. This is only in the online mode. All team game modes feature the soldiers of the Allied nations versus those of the Axis. Multiplayer features are absent from the Wii edition.

It is the first game in the Call of Duty series to introduce two different game modes. The "Normalized" mode was added to allow console players a way to adjust to the smaller kill box of Call of Duty, its expansion United Offensive, and Call of Duty 2.

On the Xbox 360, Call of Duty 3 divides its multiplayer aspect into Player and Ranked matches. Player matches allow players to invite other players into their games, but do not contribute points toward the leader board or unlock Achievements. Ranked matches put the player with and against teams of random players, and contribute towards player points and allow players to unlock Achievements.

Plot

American Campaign
In the American campaign, the player controls Private Nichols, a replacement for the 29th Infantry Division. The squad participates in the final offensive in the capture of Saint-Lô. Afterwards, they join the 90th Infantry Division as reinforcements to help secure Saint-Germain-sur-Sèves.

The squad assaults Mayenne to capture its bridge. Sergeant Frank McCullin disarms German bombs rigged to the bridge, but is mortally wounded. Corporal Mike Dixon is promoted to Sergeant and assumes command. Shortly after, the squad is sent to clear out Forêt d'Écouves and to locate a company of combat engineers; a surviving engineer reveals that their supply depot was overrun. The squad recaptures the depot and destroys a German Feldgendarmerie roadblock. They then aid in the liberation of a crossroads at Le Bourg-Saint-Léonard, trapping the remaining German forces by closing the Falaise Pocket, before being ordered to defend Chambois against those retreating.

At Chambois, the American units hold off against the Germans. Guzzo attempts to call for air support, but is wounded. Nichols and Dixon rescue him as air support arrives, but Dixon is shot and killed. Guzzo takes command and the squad retakes and defends the town as American reinforcements force the Germans to surrender. Two days later, Guzzo is promoted to Sergeant and Nichols and Huxley are promoted to Corporal, before travelling to liberate Paris.

British Campaign
In the British campaign, the player controls Sergeant James Doyle, a member of an SAS regiment, who are sent to France to assist the Maquis Resistance. Parachuting in near Toucy after their Handley Page Halifax is shot down, Doyle is rescued by Pierre LaRoche, the Maquis leader, and regroups with Corporal Duncan Keith, Major Gerald Ingram, and resistance member Isabelle DuFontaine. The group assault a manor house to free a captured Maquis member, Marcel.

The SAS and Maquis launch a raid on a German-held fuel plant and succeed in destroying its fuel and facilities. Doyle, Keith, and Marcel escape, but Ingram's vehicle crashes and he is seemingly killed. The group later receives information that Ingram is alive and being held captive in a nearby village. Doyle and Keith rescue Ingram and several captured Maquis, before fending off a German counterattack, during which Isabelle is killed.

Canadian Campaign
In the Canadian campaign, the player controls Private Joseph Cole of The Argyll and Sutherland Highlanders of Canada, led by veteran Lieutenant Jean-Guy Robichaud.

Near Tilly-la-Campagne, the platoon attacks a German artillery battery, before moving to capture a German-held industrial complex, holding off an enemy counterattack. The platoon later clears a forested area near the Laison River of several anti-tank positions and a motor pool for Allied convoys to move through. While advancing with other units to relieve Polish forces defending Hill 262, Private Leslie Baron transfers to the Polish 1st Armored Division to replace their radio operator.

Cole's squad frees a captured Canadian tank crew in St. Lambert-sur-Dives, and with their help captures the town. The squad is attacked by a King Tiger tank, and Sergeant Jonathan Callard Callard manually detonates charges on an ammunition stockpile below ground to destroy it, sacrificing himself. Robichaud recommends Callard for the Victoria Cross and promotes Cole to Corporal. The unit rejoins the Canadian reinforcements to aid the Poles.

Polish Campaign
The Polish campaign revolves around Corporal "Bohater" Wojciech, a Sherman Firefly driver in the Polish 1st Armored Division. While aiding Canadian and British forces in the French countryside, the crew engages German armored units to capture and occupy Hill 262.

Defending the hill, the crew endure an assault by the remnants of the German 7th Army in their attempt to escape the Falaise Pocket. Bohater's tank is destroyed, forcing the crew to fight on foot alongside the Polish infantry; Sergeant Łukasz Kowalski is killed. With their position overrun, the crew retreat towards the summit of Hill 262. Baron joins them and helps provide artillery support to destroy German tanks, but is killed by German fire when he refuses to flee further. At the summit, a large counterattacking German force arrive, and Corporal Joakim Rudinski is killed. After much fighting, the Royal Canadian Air Force and Canadian reinforcements appear and repel the Germans, leaving Hill 262 in Allied hands.

Downloadable content
Three map packs were released for the Xbox 360 multiplayer game on the Xbox Live Marketplace. The first, "Champs", was released as a free download on January 11, 2007, and contained a single self-titled map. The "Valor" map pack contained five new maps: Crossing, Ironclad, La Bourgade, Stalag 23, and Wildwood. The pack was released on January 27, 2007, for 800 MP ($10). The final map pack, "Bravo", contained five new maps of which two were remade from Call of Duty: United Offensive: Gare Centrale, Marseilles, Aller Haut, Seine River, and Rimling. The pack was released on May 31, 2007, for 800 MP. The price of the map packs was later reduced to 400 MP ($5) each.

Development
Call of Duty 3 was unveiled by Activision shortly before E3 2006. It was revealed that Treyarch would be developing the title (their second in the series after Call of Duty 2: Big Red One) which was set to release later that year. The game would be running on Treyarch's own internal engine, NGL. This game served as a launch title for the PlayStation 3 and Wii in North America, Europe and Australia. It was also the only major Call of Duty installment not to be released for personal computer platforms and the only numerical sequel to date to have been a console-exclusive game alongside Big Red One and Call of Duty: Finest Hour.

In an interview with Video Gamer, Call of Duty: World at War senior producer, Noah Heller, revealed the team had eight months to develop Call of Duty 3.

Reception

Call of Duty 3 received "generally positive" reviews on all platforms except for the Wii, where it received "mixed or average" reviews, according to review aggregator Metacritic. IGN gave a score of 8.8, while GameSpot gave an 8.2. The game won various awards from publications for best shooter and sound design. Institutes such as The Academy of Interactive Arts and Sciences awarded the game for Outstanding Achievement in Sound Design in 2007.

Sales
Upon release, Call of Duty 3 was one of the best selling titles of November 2006 in the United States. The game debuted at #3 on UK charts and dropped off the top 10 list by February 2007. By the end of 2006, the game had sold approximately 1.1 million units in the US according to NPD Group. By February 3, 2007, total sales in the United States were 2 million units. The Xbox 360 and PlayStation 2 releases of Call of Duty 3 each received a "Platinum" sales award from the Entertainment and Leisure Software Publishers Association (ELSPA), indicating sales of at least 300,000 copies per version in the United Kingdom. By November 2013, the game had sold 7.2 million copies worldwide.

References

External links
 
 

2006 video games
Activision games
3
Interactive Achievement Award winners
Multiplayer and single-player video games
PlayStation 2 games
PlayStation 3 games
Treyarch games
Video game sequels
Video games about the Special Air Service
Video games scored by Joel Goldsmith
Video games set in France
Video games set in Germany
Video games set in 1944
Wii games
World War II first-person shooters
Xbox 360 games
Xbox games
Video games developed in the United States